Pterostyrax hispidus, the epaulette tree or fragrant epaulette tree, is a species of flowering plant in the family Styracaceae, native to China and Japan.

The specific epithet hispidus (often given incorrectly as hispida or hispidum) refers to the small ribbed fruits which are covered in bristles. The common name "epaulette tree" refers to the fringed individual flowers.

In cultivation the plant has gained the Royal Horticultural Society's Award of Garden Merit.

References

Flora of China
Flora of Japan
Styracaceae